Plectropoda is a genus of squash bugs  belonging to the family Coreidae.

Species

 Plectropoda affinis  (Distant, 1900)
 Plectropoda basilewskyi Schouteden, 1957
 Plectropoda bicolor (Haglund, 1895)
 Plectropoda bubi Villiers, 1955
 Plectropoda cruciata (Dallas, 1852)
 Plectropoda dekeyseri  (Villiers, 1950)
 Plectropoda ghesquierei Schouteden, 1938
 Plectropoda gnathenion Linnavuori, 1973
 Plectropoda granulata (Stål, 1866)
 Plectropoda hottentota (Palisot de Beauvois, 1805)
 Plectropoda lividipes (Fairmaire, 1858) 
 Plectropoda lobata (Haglund, 1895)
 Plectropoda mesophila O'Shea, 1980 
 Plectropoda oblongipes (Fabricius, 1803)
 Plectropoda rothi (Dallas, 1852) 
 Plectropoda spinosula (Signoret, 1858)
 Plectropoda sublobata Schouteden, 1938
 Plectropoda superba Schouteden, 1938 
 Plectropoda suspecta Schouteden, 1938
 Plectropoda terminalis (Dallas, 1852)
 Plectropoda undata (Dallas, 1852)
 Plectropoda vrijdaghi Schouteden, 1938

References

Mictini
Coreidae genera